Vera Weizmann (née Chatzman) (November 27, 1881 – September 24, 1966), wife of Chaim Weizmann, the first president of the State of Israel, was a medical doctor and a Zionist activist.

Biography

Vera Chatzman was born in the town of Rostov-on-Don, in the Russian Empire, the daughter of Isaiah and Feodosia Chatzman. She initially studied music before taking up medical training in Geneva, Switzerland. There she met Chaim Weizmann at the University's Zionist Club.

In 1906 she married Weizmann at Zoppot, Prussia, today called Sopot, in Poland, and later that year they settled in Manchester, England. There they had two sons, Benjamin born in 1907, and Michael born in 1916. The Weizmann family lived in Manchester for thirty years, from 1906 until 1937. In 1913, Vera Weizmann received her English medical license and worked as a doctor in the public health service at clinics for infants, developing advanced techniques for infant supervision and nutrition.

The elder son, Benjamin (Benjie) Weizmann (1907–1980), settled in Ireland and became a dairy farmer. The Weizmanns’ younger son, Michael, served as a pilot in the British Royal Air Force during the Second World War and was killed on active service when his plane was shot down over the Bay of Biscay.

Volunteer work 

In 1916, Weizmann gave up her work as a pediatrician when she joined her husband upon his appointment as the scientific adviser in chemistry to the British Admiralty during the First World War. In 1920, she was one of the founding members of the Women's International Zionist Organization (WIZO), and served as its president, alternating with Lady Sieff, for forty years. When the Second World War broke out in 1939, she devoted all of her efforts to Youth Aliyah (Aliyat Hanoar), an organization that she established in England and continued to head as honorary president while living in Israel.

During the 1948 Arab-Israeli War, Weizmann focused on the treatment and rehabilitation of wounded soldiers. Immediately after the war, she established the Association of the War of Independence Handicapped Veterans and served as its president. She also established two centers for the rehabilitation of wounded soldiers, Beit Kay in Nahariya and the Department of Rehabilitation at Sheba—Tel Hashomer Hospital.

In addition to her activity in these organizations, Weizmann gave her support to many voluntary organizations such as ILAN, Magen David Adom, for which she served as President, and dozens of other private and institutional charitable endeavors.

Weizmann House
As first lady, Weizmann had the interior of the house built for the couple at Weizmann Institute redesigned.  All of the furniture and art was original, mostly imported from England and France.

Published work
The Impossible Takes Longer: The Memoirs of Vera Weizmann

References

External links
 VERA WEIZMANN 1881 – 1966 by Esther Carmel-Hakim

1881 births
1966 deaths
British emigrants to Israel
British Jews
British people of Russian-Jewish descent
British paediatricians
Women pediatricians
Emigrants from the Russian Empire to the United Kingdom
Israeli Jews
Israeli people of British-Jewish descent
Israeli people of Russian-Jewish descent
Israeli rehabilitation physicians
People from Rostov
Russian Jews
Spouses of presidents of Israel
British women medical doctors
Israeli women physicians
Zionist activists
Vera
Women's International Zionist Organization politicians